Dan or Daniel Walker may refer to:

Dan Walker (broadcaster) (born 1977), English sports and current affairs journalist and presenter
Dan Walker (politician) (1922–2015), American politician and banker who was Governor of Illinois
Daniel E. Walker (1927–2009), United States Army veteran, known as "Dan Walker", who buried a burned flag
D. P. Walker (1914–1985), English historian and author